Antonio Gresta (1671 in Ala, Trentino – 1727 in Bruchsal) was an Italian painter.

Gresta apparently trained in Verona and Venice. Among his works are frescoes in the church of the Carmine in Trento. Along with the painter-sculptor Gaspare Antonio Baroni di Cavalcabò, he helped decorate the church of the Santissimi Trinità in Sacco near Rovereto; the Palazzi Pizzini and Taddei in Ala; and the bishop's residence in Bressanone. Gresta painted altarpieces for parish churches in Ala. A year before his death, he traveled to the German town of Bruchsal to become court painter.

References

External links

1671 births
1727 deaths
Painters from Venice
17th-century Italian painters
Italian male painters
18th-century Italian painters
People from Ala, Trentino
18th-century Italian male artists